Agustín Javier Fernández Charro (born 15 March 1982), known simply as Agustín, is a Spanish footballer who plays for CF Montañesa as a central defender.

Football career
Born in Mérida, Extremadura, Agustín began his career at hometown club CP Mérida and made his senior debut with its successor Mérida UD in Tercera División in 1999, also playing at Real Madrid C. After transferring to CD Badajoz in 2003, he went on to spend the vast majority of his career in Segunda División B with nine different teams, making over 300 appearances in the category. Following CF Palencia's relegation in 2008, he joined CE Sabadell FC, helping them gain promotion to Segunda División in the 2010–11 season.

Aged nearly 30, Agustín played his first professional game with the Catalans on 4 February 2012, by featuring for the full 90 minutes in their away goalless draw against SD Huesca. On 7 April, he was sent off near the end of a 1–0 win over regional rivals Gimnàstic de Tarragona at the Estadi de la Nova Creu Alta for aggression against Mikel Orbegozo; he totalled 16 appearances over the campaign, equalising in a 1–2 loss to Celta de Vigo on 5 May.

Agustín joined third level side Deportivo Alavés on 4 July 2012, helping to promotion his only season and repeating the feat with Racing de Santander in the following year. Subsequently, he represented a host of clubs in division three.

On 3 October 2018, Fernández signed for CF Montañesa.

References

External links

Agustín Fernández at LaPreferente

1982 births
Living people
People from Mérida, Spain
Sportspeople from the Province of Badajoz
Spanish footballers
Footballers from Extremadura
Association football defenders
Segunda División players
Segunda División B players
Tercera División players
Mérida UD footballers
Real Madrid C footballers
CD Badajoz players
CD Eldense footballers
CF Palencia footballers
CE Sabadell FC footballers
Deportivo Alavés players
Racing de Santander players
UE Olot players
CE L'Hospitalet players
CF Gavà players